Kharavan-e Olya (also Romanized as Kharāvān-e ‘Olyā; also known as Kharavān-e Bālā) is a village in Golshan Rural District, in the Central District of Tabas County, South Khorasan Province, Iran. At the 2006 census, its population was 53, in 12 families.

References 

Populated places in Tabas County